In Euclidean geometry, a plane is a flat two-dimensional surface that extends indefinitely. 
Euclidean planes often arise as subspaces of three-dimensional space .
A prototypical example is one of a room's walls, infinitely extended and assumed infinitesimal thin.
While a pair of real numbers  suffices to describe points on a plane, the relationship with out-of-plane points requires special consideration for their embedding in the ambient space .

Derived concepts
A plane segment (or simply "plane", in lay use) is a planar surface region; it is analogous to a line segment.
A bivector is an oriented plane segment, analogous to directed line segments.
A face is a plane segment bounding a solid object.
A slab is a region bounded by two parallel planes.
A parallelepiped is a region bounded by three pairs of parallel planes.

Occurrence in nature

A plane serves as a mathematical model for many physical phenomena, such as specular reflection in a plane mirror or wavefronts in a traveling plane wave.
The free surface of undisturbed liquids tends to be nearly flat (see flatness).
The flattest surface ever manufactured is a quantum-stabilized atom mirror.
In astronomy, various reference planes are used to define positions in orbit.
Anatomical planes may be lateral ("sagittal"), frontal ("coronal") or transversal.
In geology, beds (layers of sediments) often are planar.
Planes are involved in different forms of imaging, such as the focal plane, picture plane, and image plane.

Background

Euclid set forth the first great landmark of mathematical thought, an axiomatic treatment of geometry. He selected a small core of undefined terms (called common notions) and postulates (or axioms) which he then used to prove various geometrical statements. Although the plane in its modern sense is not directly given a definition anywhere in the Elements, it may be thought of as part of the common notions. Euclid never used numbers to measure length, angle, or area. The Euclidean plane equipped with a chosen Cartesian coordinate system is called a Cartesian plane; a non-Cartesian Euclidean plane equipped with a polar coordinate system would be called a polar plane.

A plane is a ruled surface.

Euclidean plane

Representation

Determination by contained points and lines
In a Euclidean space of any number of dimensions, a plane is uniquely determined by any of the following:
 Three non-collinear points (points not on a single line).
 A line and a point not on that line.
 Two distinct but intersecting lines.
 Two distinct but parallel lines.

Properties
The following statements hold in three-dimensional Euclidean space but not in higher dimensions, though they have higher-dimensional analogues:
 Two distinct planes are either parallel or they intersect in a line.
 A line is either parallel to a plane, intersects it at a single point, or is contained in the plane.
 Two distinct lines perpendicular to the same plane must be parallel to each other.
 Two distinct planes perpendicular to the same line must be parallel to each other.

Point–normal form and general form of the equation of a plane
In a manner analogous to the way lines in a two-dimensional space are described using a point-slope form for their equations, planes in a three dimensional space have a natural description using a point in the plane and a vector orthogonal to it (the normal vector) to indicate its "inclination".

Specifically, let  be the position vector of some point , and let  be a nonzero vector. Recalling that two vectors are perpendicular if and only if their dot product is zero, it follows that the desired plane can be described as the set of all points  such that

The dot here means a dot (scalar) product.
Expanded this becomes

which is the point–normal form of the equation of a plane. This is just a linear equation

where

which is the expanded form of 

In mathematics it is a common convention to express the normal as a unit vector, but the above argument holds for a normal vector of any non-zero length.

is a plane having the vector  as a normal. This familiar equation for a plane is called the general form of the equation of the plane.

Thus for example a regression equation of the form  (with ) establishes a best-fit plane in three-dimensional space when there are two explanatory variables.

Describing a plane with a point and two vectors lying on it
Alternatively, a plane may be described parametrically as the set of all points of the form

The vectors  and  can be perpendicular, but cannot be parallel.

Describing a plane through three points

Method 1

Method 2
To describe the plane by an equation of the form , solve the following system of equations:

This system can be solved using Cramer's rule and basic matrix manipulations. Let

These equations are parametric in d. Setting d equal to any non-zero number and substituting it into these equations will yield one solution set.

Method 3
This plane can also be described by the "point and a normal vector" prescription above. A suitable normal vector is given by the cross product

Operations

Distance from a point to a plane

Line–plane intersection

Line of intersection between two planes

Sphere–plane intersection

See also

 Flat (geometry)
 Half-plane
 Hyperplane
 Plane coordinates
 Plane of incidence
 Plane of rotation
 Plane orientation
 Polygon

Notes

References

External links

 
 
 "Easing the Difficulty of Arithmetic and Planar Geometry" is an Arabic manuscript, from the 15th century, that serves as a tutorial about plane geometry and arithmetic.